The Chairman of the Legislative Assembly of Chelyabinsk Oblast is the presiding officer of that legislature.

Office-holders

Sources 
The Legislative Assembly of Chelyabinsk Oblast

Lists of legislative speakers in Russia
Politics of Chelyabinsk Oblast